Langsdorfia buckleyi is a moth in the family Cossidae first described by Herbert Druce in 1901. It is found in Ecuador.

References

Hypoptinae
Moths described in 1901